Union County Airport  is a public use airport in Union County, Ohio, United States. It is owned by the Union County Airport Authority and located one nautical mile (2 km) southeast of the central business district of Marysville, Ohio. This airport is included in the National Plan of Integrated Airport Systems for 2011–2015, which categorized it as a general aviation facility.

Although most U.S. airports use the same three-letter location identifier for the FAA and IATA, this airport is assigned MRT by the FAA, but has no designation from the IATA (which assigned MRT to Moroak, Northern Territory, Australia).

Facilities and aircraft 
Union County Airport covers an area of 54 acres (22 ha) at an elevation of 1,021 feet (311 m) above mean sea level. It has one runway designated 9/27 with an asphalt surface measuring 4,218 by 75 feet (1,286 x 23 m).

For the 12-month period ending June 5, 2012, the airport had 31,886 aircraft operations, an average of 87 per day: 88% general aviation, 10% military, and 2% air taxi.
At that time there were 45 aircraft based at this airport: 40 single-engine, 2 multi-engine, 1 jet, 1 helicopter, and 1 ultralight.

References

External links 
 Airport page at Union County website
 Aerial image as of April 1994 from USGS The National Map
  Prime Aero Inc., the fixed-base operator (FBO)
 

Airports in Ohio
Buildings and structures in Union County, Ohio
Transportation in Union County, Ohio